Reda railway station is a railway station serving the town of Reda, in the Pomeranian Voivodeship, Poland. The station opened in 1870 and is located on the Gdańsk–Stargard railway, the parallel Gdańsk Śródmieście–Rumia railway and Reda–Hel railway. The train services are operated by Przewozy Regionalne and SKM Tricity.

Train services
The station is served by the following services:

Regional services (R) Tczew — Słupsk  
Regional services (R) Malbork — Słupsk  
Regional services (R) Elbląg — Słupsk  
Regional services (R) Słupsk — Bydgoszcz Główna 
Regional services (R) Władysławowo - Reda - Gdynia Główna
Regional services (R) Hel - Władysławowo - Reda - Gdynia Główna
Regional services (R) Luzino — Gdynia Główna
Regional services (R) Słupsk — Gdynia Główna
Szybka Kolej Miejska services (SKM) (Lębork -) Wejherowo - Reda - Rumia - Gdynia - Sopot - Gdansk'

 References 

 This article is based upon a translation of the Polish language version as of August 2016.''

External links

Railway stations served by Szybka Kolej Miejska (Tricity)
Railway stations served by Przewozy Regionalne InterRegio
Reda
Wejherowo County
Railway stations in Poland opened in 1870